Giorgios Vamkaitis was a Greek marathoner who competed in the 1904 Olympic Games in St. Louis, USA. He did not complete the 1904 Olympic marathon, one that was marked by bizarre results.

References

Athletes (track and field) at the 1904 Summer Olympics
Greek male marathon runners
Olympic athletes of Greece
Year of birth missing
Year of death missing
20th-century Greek people